Wangga (sometimes spelled Wongga) is an Aboriginal Australian genre of traditional music and ceremony which originated in Northern Territory and north Western Australia. Specifically, from South Alligator River south east towards Ngukurr, south to the Katherine and west into the Kimberley. The Yolngu peoples of Arnhem Land created the genre.

In 1938, Australian anthropologist A. P. Elkin described Wangga, "[It] starts as a sudden high note, then descends in regular intervals to a low pitch, after which the songman just beats his sticks to the accompaniment of the didgeridoo. Twenty seconds or more later, the melody is sung as before and so on" and lyrics tend to be syllables. Typically, the songs and dances express themes related to death and regeneration. The songs are performed publicly. The singers compose from their daily lives or while dreaming of a nyuidj (dead spirit).

Recordings

See also

Music of Australia
Indigenous Australian music

References

External links
Samples at Manikay.Com
Wangga dancers from Eastern Kimberly Group, at Australia Council for the Arts website.

Indigenous Australian music